Santaworld is a Santa Claus-based theme park on the Gesunda Mountain south of Mora, Sweden. It was opened on 8 December 1984.

It featured prominently in the music video to Shakin' Stevens's 1985 single "Merry Christmas Everyone".

References

External links
 

1984 establishments in Sweden
Amusement parks in Sweden
Christmas in Sweden
Santa Claus
Amusement parks opened in 1984